Caught Up in the Gears of Application is the third and final album by American heavy metal band Superjoint. It was released on November 11, 2016, through Phil Anselmo's own record label Housecore Records. Caught Up in the Gears of Application is the first full-length studio album put out by the band in over 13 years.

Track listing

Personnel 
Phil Anselmo – vocals
Kevin Bond – lead guitar
Jimmy Bower – rhythm guitar
Stephen Taylor – bass
Jose Manuel "Blue" Gonzales – drums

References 

2016 albums
Superjoint albums
Albums produced by Phil Anselmo